Ella Nora Phillips Stewart (March 6, 1893 – November 27, 1987) was an American pharmacist who was one of the first African American female pharmacists in the United States.

Early life and education

Stewart was born Ella Nora Phillips, in Stringtown, a small village near Berryville, in Clark County, Virginia, the oldest of the four children of Henry H. Philips and Eliza T. (Carr) Phillips. Her parents were sharecroppers. When she was six years old she was sent to live with her paternal grandmother in Berryville, to attend grade school. An outstanding student, she graduated at the top of her grade school class, and won several major scholarships to what was then the Storer Normal School (later, Storer College), in nearby Harpers Ferry, West Virginia; she entered Storer at the age of 12.

Stewart withdrew from the teacher training program at Storer in order to marry Charles Myers, who was a classmate there. The couple moved to Pittsburgh, Pennsylvania. After their only child, Virginia, died of whooping cough at the age of three, they divorced.

In Pittsburgh, Stewart began working in a local pharmacy as a bookkeeper, and her job sparked in her an interest in becoming a pharmacist. Despite the challenges she faced both as a woman and as an African American, she gained admittance to the University of Pittsburgh School of Pharmacy in 1914. She completed her degree in pharmaceutical chemistry (Ph.C.) in 1916, becoming the first black woman to graduate from Pitt's pharmacy program. In the same year, Stewart passed the state examination becoming the first African American female pharmacist in the state of Pennsylvania and one of the first African American female pharmacists in the country.

Career 

Stewart initially worked as an assistant pharmacist for the Mendelsson Drug Company, owned by two classmates from the University of Pittsburgh. She later went on to own and operate a drugstore at the General Hospital in Braddock, Pennsylvania. In 1918 she moved back to Pittsburgh, where she again established her own business, Myers Pharmacy.

In 1920, she married William Wyatt Stewart, a fellow pharmacist in Pittsburgh, and a fellow alumnus of the Pitt pharmacy program. The couple settled in Youngstown, Ohio, where, Ella Stewart was hired as a pharmacist at the Youngstown City Hospital. After some time, she and her husband moved to Detroit, where they stayed only briefly; in 1922, they decided to move to Toledo, Ohio to open their own pharmacy.

Ella and William Stewart opened Stewarts' Pharmacy, located at the corner of Indiana and City Park Avenues (566 Indiana Avenue), in Toledo, in July 1922, and operated it until 1945, when they sold the business.
Located in Toledo's Pinewood district, where some two thirds of the city's African Americans lived by the end of the 1920s, the pharmacy became a popular neighborhood gathering place. The Stewarts, who owned the building and lived in the spacious eight rooms above the pharmacy, often hosted visitors from out of town, including Marian Anderson, Mary McLeod Bethune, and W. E. B. Du Bois.

Civic activities
By the 1930s Stewart became a leading member of community groups in Toledo, including the Young Women's Christian Association (YWCA) and the Enterprise Charity Club, a social-service organization run by African-American women. From 1944 to 1948 she served as president of the Ohio Association of Colored Women; and from 1948 to 1952, as president of the National Association of Colored Women's Clubs (NACWC). As leader of the NACWC, Stewart spoke out against segregation, discrimination, and racist stereotypes. In 1961 she became an inaugural member of the Toledo Board of Community Relations, which worked to improve race relations in the city, and to ensure enforcement of civil-rights legislation.

Stewart's civic activities eventually took on an international dimension: in 1952 she was appointed as an American delegate to the International Conference of Women of the World, held in Athens, Greece. She subsequently spent time during the 1950s touring as a goodwill ambassador for the United States; in 1954 one such U.S. State Department tour took her to several nations in Southeast Asia, including India, Indonesia, Pakistan, and Sri Lanka. In 1963 she was appointed to the United States commission of the United Nations Educational, Scientific and Cultural Organization (UNESCO).

Stewart spent the rest of her life in Toledo, remaining active as a volunteer and philanthropist. Her husband William Stewart died in 1976 at the age of 83, and she moved into a retirement home a few years later, in 1980. She died in 1987, at the age of 94.

Legacy 

Ella Nora Phillips Stewart is known not only for becoming one of the first African American female pharmacists but also for her struggles against discrimination and her impact in the community.

Selected awards and honors

 1961: A new school in Toledo was named in her honor, the Ella P. Stewart Elementary School (later: Ella P. Stewart Academy for Girls). In subsequent years Stewart volunteered there regularly. In 1974 the school created a museum to house Stewart's plaques and awards, and memorabilia she collected on her international tours.
 1969: Named to the roster of Distinguished Alumni of the University of Pittsburgh School of Pharmacy
1974: Honorary doctorate, University of Toledo
1978: Inducted into the Ohio Women's Hall of Fame
1999 (posthumous): Inaugural inductee into the Toledo Civic Hall of Fame

References

External links 
 Guide to the Papers of Ella P. Stewart; Summary view. Bowling Green State University, Bowling Green, OH. Includes digitized items.
 Papers of Ella P. Stewart (catalog record), University of Toledo, Ohio

1893 births
1987 deaths
People from Clarke County, Virginia
People from West Virginia
People from Youngstown, Ohio
American pharmacists
Women pharmacists
University of Pittsburgh alumni
African-American history of West Virginia
People from Toledo, Ohio
Presidents of the National Association of Colored Women's Clubs